Krzyżkowice  is an Upper Silesian village in the administrative district of Gmina Lubrza, within Prudnik County, Opole Voivodeship, in south-western Poland, close to the Czech border. 

The village has a population of 240.

References

Villages in Prudnik County